Yolombó is a town and municipality in the Colombian department of Antioquia. It is part of the subregion of Northeastern Antioquia, located 108 km from Medellín.

History

Yolombó is an indigenous term that comes from the area. In 1535, Don Pedro de Heredia, the founder of Cartagena de Indias, discovered, in the Antioquian region, a village of indigenous people of the same name, Yolombó. The town was initially called, "San Lorenzo de Yolombó." No official date of its founding is known to exist.

In the middle of the 17th century, gold was found in the area and made Yolombó a celebrated and important town. Parish records revealed the growing prominence of the town by the settlement of high ranking Spanish families.  Up until 1750, its prosperity earned Yolombó the name, Ciudad Illustre (Illustrious City). However, the prosperity was short-lived. Between 1760 and 1800 the gold mines were depleted with the advent and use of efficient mining technology. Following this economic decline, Yolombó was downgraded to a township of the city Santo Domingo in 1879 until 1883. In 1883 Yolombó was once again promoted to the status of District and Township and it has remained as such until 2009 when it became a municipality.

Yolombó has a diverse climate and rich biodiversity. At 1,450 km above sea level, the mountainous landscape offers both scorching and frigid temperatures. It is known for its exotic agriculture, forests full of medicinal plants and precious wood, and it is also a land that is abundant in water and pasture.

Demographics 
Total Population: 23,958 (2015) 
 Urban Population: 7,216
 Rural Population: 16,742
Total Literacy Rate: 84.3% (2005)
 Urban Literacy Rate: 90.5%
 Rural Literacy Rate: 81.5%

According to  DANE census records from 2005, the racial makeup of Yolombó is composed of:
 Mestizo & White (98.0%)
 Afrocolombian (1.9%)
 Indigenous (0.1%)

Climate
Yolombó has a tropical rainforest climate (Af) with heavy rainfall year-round.

Notable residents
Sofía Medina de López – Colombian politician, first female Mayor of Medellín (1976–1977)

Yolombó in the media
Yolombó was popularized in part by Tomás Carrasquilla's historical novel, "La Marquesa de Yolombó" (The Marquise of Yolombó).

References

Municipalities of Antioquia Department